Colin Firth is a British actor who has had an extensive career both on stage and screen, having received an Academy Award, a Golden Globe Award, two BAFTA Awards, three Screen Actors Guild Awards, and a Volpi Cup. Firth's films have grossed more than $4 billion from over 50 releases worldwide.

Film

Television

Theatre

References

Male actor filmographies
British filmographies